Goria Ter ('ter' being the word for 'festival' in the Kokborok language) is observed for seven days by indigenous Tripuri, honoring universal god Baba Goria, beginning on the last day of Chaitra until Hari Buisu. The first day of the puja is called 'Moha Buisu' and the day of immersion is called 'Sena'. The articles that are essential during the puja are kept strictly under lock in the house of Kherphang as per the rule of the Goria puja.

As a mark of the beginning of Goria Puja, Chukbar is made strictly before the Goria Puja — seven days before the puja is due. That day the articles that were kept locked during one year are brought out. Immediately the sound of a drumbeat is marks the beginning of puja followed by the playing of a flute. The Goria dance is also performed. In Tripuri Jamatia clan, Goria Puja is observed in two places with full enthusiasm:

 Bia Gwnang
 Bia Kwrwi

The society/institute regulates the rules of the Goria Puja. A group of Bogla is selected to help the pilgrims in their troubles during the seven days, and Mohanta is selected by the Hoda to monitor and guide the Bogla in accordance with the resolution adopted by the Hoda and as per traditional rites. Two Goria volunteers from each region are also selected each year for maintaining discipline and peace during the Goria Puja.

See also
 Jamatia Hoda

See also
 Original king Goria ang story

References

Religion in Tripura
Festivals in Tripura